Octavio Antonio Beras Rojas (16 November 1906 – 1 December 1990) was a Dominican cardinal of the Roman Catholic Church. He served as Archbishop of Santo Domingo from 1961 to 1981, and was elevated to the cardinalate in 1976.

Biography
Octavio Beras Rojas was born in Santa Lucía, in El Seibo Province, as the eldest of the three children of Octavio Beras Zorrilla, congressman and governor of El Seibo, and Teresa Rojas Santana (a great-granddaughter of Ramón Santana). He received his first Communion from Archbishop Adolfo Alejandro Nouel, and studied at the Seminary of St. Thomas Aquinas, in Santo Domingo from 1923 to 1926. He was then sent to Rome, where he studied at the Pontifical Gregorian University whilst residing at the Pontifical Collegio Pio Latino Americano.

Later returning to the Santo Domingo seminary for health reasons, Beras was ordained to the priesthood on 13 August 1933 and then did pastoral work in Santiago de los Caballeros until 1935, whence he was transferred to Santo Domingo. Whilst there, from 1935 to 1945, he served successively as secretary general of archdiocese; director of the ecclesiastical bulletin, weekly newspaper Verdad Católica, and of the Catholic radio station; president of the ecclesiastical tribunal; and organizer of the archdiocesan synod. He also founded the Federation of Catholic Youth, and was named an honorary canon of the metropolitan chapter, pro-vicar general, and pastor of the metropolitan cathedral.

On 2 May 1945 Beras was appointed Coadjutor Archbishop of Santo Domingo and Titular Archbishop of Euchaitae by Pope Pius XII. He received his episcopal consecration on the following 12 August from Archbishop Manuel Arteaga y Betancourt, with Archbishop Enrique Pérez Serantes and Bishop Aloysius Willinger, CSSR, serving as co-consecrators. After becoming Apostolic Administrator sede plena of Santo Domingo, Beras acted as the secretary general of the first conference of the Latin American Episcopal Conference, from 25 July to 2 August 1955, in Rio de Janeiro, Brazil.

He later succeeded the late Ricardo Pittini Piussi, SDB, as Archbishop of Santo Domingo, and thus Primate of the Dominican Republic, on 10 December 1961. Beras was appointed Military Vicar for the Dominican Republic on 8 December 1962, and was a member of the Central Preparatory Commission of the Second Vatican Council from 1962 to 1965. In 1965, he was also made President of the Episcopal Conference of Dominican Republic.

Pope Paul VI created him Cardinal Priest of S. Sisto in the consistory of 24 May 1976. Beras, the first cardinal from the Dominican Republic, was one of the cardinal electors who participated in the conclaves of August and October 1978, which selected Popes John Paul I and John Paul II respectively. He resigned as his post as Archbishop on 15 November 1981, after nearly twenty years of service, and his post in the military vicariate a year later, on 15 November 1982. Beras lost the right to participate in any conclaves upon reaching the age of eighty on 16 November 1986.

The Cardinal died in Santo Domingo, at age 84. He is buried at the primatial and metropolitan cathedral of the same, the Catedral de Santa María la Menor

External links
Cardinals of the Holy Roman Church
Catholic-Hierarchy

1906 births
1990 deaths
20th-century Roman Catholic archbishops in the Dominican Republic
Cardinals created by Pope Paul VI
Roman Catholic archbishops of Santo Domingo
Dominican Republic cardinals
Participants in the Second Vatican Council
White Dominicans
People from El Seibo Province